Victoriano Sosa is a Cuban former Negro league catcher who played in the 1940s.

A native of Cuba, Sosa played for the Homestead Grays during their 1948 Negro World Series championship season. In three recorded games, he posted a hit and a walk in seven plate appearances.

References

External links
 and Seamheads

Year of birth missing
Place of birth missing
Homestead Grays players